The  is an annual literary prize awarded by Japanese literary magazine Gunzo, published by Kodansha. It was established in 1958 with two categories, one for novels and one for commentary. According to submission rules, novels submitted must be between 250 and 500 pages, while commentary must be no more than 100 pages (raised from 50 pages in 2003). The winning writer receives a prize of 500,000 yen, with the winning work being published in the June edition of Gunzo.

List of winners

Novels

Numbers 1 through 10

Numbers 11 through 20

Numbers 21 through 30

Numbers 31 through 40

Numbers 41 through 50			

Japanese literary awards
Awards established in 1958
1958 establishments in Japan
Kodansha